The TIOBE programming community index is a measure of popularity of programming languages, created and maintained by TIOBE Software BV, based in Eindhoven, the Netherlands. TIOBE stands for The Importance of Being Earnest, the title of an 1895 comedy play by Oscar Wilde, to emphasize the organization's "sincere and professional attitude towards customers, suppliers and colleagues".

The index is calculated from the number of search engine results for queries containing the name of the language. The index covers searches in Google, Google Blogs, MSN, Yahoo!, Baidu, Wikipedia and YouTube. The index is updated once a month. The current information is free, but the long-term statistical data is for sale. The index authors have stated that it may be valuable when making various strategic decisions. TIOBE focuses on Turing complete languages, so it does not provide information about the popularity of, for instance, HTML.

History 
TIOBE index is sensitive to the ranking policy of the search engines on which it is based. For instance, in April 2004 Google performed a cleanup action to get rid of unfair attempts to promote the search rank. As a consequence, there was a large drop for languages such as Java and C++, yet these languages have stayed at the top of the table. To avoid such fluctuations, TIOBE now uses multiple search engines.

In August 2016, C reached its lowest ratings score since the index was launched, but was still the second most popular language after Java, while in May 2020, C regained the top, and since then Java has substantially gone down in popularity while still maintaining number two position until November 2020, when Python overtook Java, taking the number two position. In 2021, Java regained its number two position and in 2022, Python overtook both Java and C to become the most popular programming language.

The TIOBE programming language of the year award goes to the language with the biggest annual popularity gain in the index, e.g., Go was the programming language of the year in 2016, and Python won the award for 2020.

Criticisms 
Maintainers specify that the TIOBE index is "not about the best programming language or the language in which most lines of code have been written", but do claim that the number of web pages may reflect the number of skilled engineers, courses and jobs worldwide.

Pierre Carbonnelle challenges TIOBE's naming of Objective-C as the "programming language of the year" in 2012, arguing that there may be many Objective-C pages on the web, but they are rarely read.  It proposes its own PYPL index instead, based on Google Trends data. It shows popularity trends since 2004, worldwide and for 5 countries.

Bjarne Stroustrup thinks TIOBE mostly measures "noise" and should report its findings in decibels rather than "popularity". 

Tim Bunce, author of the Perl DBI, has been critical of the index and its methods of ranking.

References

External links 
 

Programming language topics